Eduard Schleich may refer to:

 Eduard Schleich the Elder (1812–1874), German landscape painter
 Eduard Schleich the Younger (1853-1893), his son, also a German landscape painter 
 Eduard Ritter von Schleich (1888–1947), his grandson, a German flying ace

See also
Schleich,a German company that makes toy figurines and accessories
Schleich, Germany, a city in the Trier-Saarburg district